The discography of Alanis Morissette, a Canadian-American singer-songwriter, comprises  ten studio albums, three live albums, six compilation albums, two extended plays, 43 singles, twelve promotional singles, six video albums, and 33 music videos. She has sold more than 75 million albums worldwide.

With the stage name of Alanis, she signed a record deal with the Canadian division of MCA Records for two dance-pop albums. The label released her self-titled album (1991), which was certified platinum by the Canadian Recording Industry Association and earned her a Juno Award, and Now Is the Time (1992), which was less successful. These albums, released only in Canada, are often not mentioned in the media, which tend to consider Jagged Little Pill (1995), released on Maverick Records, as her debut album. Jagged remains one of the most successful albums in music history, holding the record as the best-selling debut album worldwide, the second best-selling album by a female artist (behind Shania Twain's Come On Over) and having sold more than 33 million copies worldwide. Such hits as "You Oughta Know", "Hand in My Pocket", "Ironic", and "Head over Feet" helped Morissette become the first Canadian woman to top the Billboard 200. Jagged stayed there for 12 weeks and remained in the Top 10 for a year and a half (72 weeks). Between 1996 and 1997 Morissette won four Grammy Awards, three MTV Video Music Awards, and seven Juno Awards. In addition, Jagged Little Pill, Live earned her another Grammy Award in 1998.

Morissette contributed to the City of Angels soundtrack, writing and performing "Uninvited". The song was the winner in two categories at the 41st Grammy Awards. Her second album, Supposed Former Infatuation Junkie, was released in 1998 and debuted at number one in the Billboard 200, becoming Morissette's second consecutive number-one album and, at the time, the fastest-selling album by a female in the United States. Supposed produced four singles: "Thank U", "Joining You", "Unsent" and "So Pure". Morissette herself directed all music videos from the album, except for the controversial "Thank U". Shortly afterwards, MTV Unplugged (sometimes titled Alanis Unplugged) was released in 1999.

Under Rug Swept (2002), her following release, debuted at number one in 12 countries, including the United States (where it was her third consecutive number-one album), and produced the hit single "Hands Clean". The album helped Morissette get the Jack Richardson Producer of the Year Award. Having many leftovers from the Under Rug Swept recording session, Morissette released Feast on Scraps, a CD/DVD package, the same year. So-Called Chaos (2004) debuted at number five on Billboard 200 and was less successful. In 2005, Morissette released The Collection, her first and so far the only greatest hits compilation, and Jagged Little Pill Acoustic, which marked a 10-year anniversary of the original album. Her seventh studio set, Flavors of Entanglement, was released in 2008 and became her last album on Maverick Records. Morissette's next studio album, Havoc and Bright Lights, was released on August 28, 2012 through Collective Sounds. The album spawned three singles: "Guardian", "Lens", and "Receive".

Morissette released her ninth studio album, Such Pretty Forks in the Road, on July 31, 2020. The album's lead single, "Reasons I Drink", was released on December 2, 2019.

On June 17, 2022, Morissette released her debut meditation album, The Storm Before the Calm, in partnership with the Calm app.

Albums

Studio albums

Compilation albums

Live albums

Extended plays

Singles

Promotional singles

Other charted songs

Other appearances

Videography

Video albums

Music videos

See also
List of songs recorded by Alanis Morissette
Vancouver Sessions

Notes

References

External links
Official site

Discographies of Canadian artists
Discographies of American artists
Pop music discographies
Rock music discographies
Discography